Supachai Kamsab is a professional footballer from Thailand.

Career
Kamsab played in Thai League 1 with Rajnavy Rayong during 2009 and 2010.

Kamsab was playing in the semi-professional Thai League 4 with Royal Thai Fleet F.C. during 2017.

References

External links
Profile at Thaipremierleague.co.th

Living people
Supachai Kamsab
1984 births
Supachai Kamsab
Association football midfielders
Supachai Kamsab